Eric Robinson (born February 5, 1953) is an Aboriginal politician in Manitoba, Canada.  He was previously a member of the Manitoba legislature, and a cabinet minister in the New Democratic government of Greg Selinger.

Born in Norway House, Manitoba, he was placed in a residential school at the age of five. Robinson is a member of the Cross Lake First Nation, covered under Treaty 5.  Robinson worked at a variety of jobs including dishwasher in Churchill, an addiction counsellor in British Columbia and a radio disc jockey. He has been active in Aboriginal issues for several years, and has worked for the Assembly of First Nations and the Brotherhood of Indian Nations, as well as other organizations promoting native rights within Canada.

Before entering provincial politics, Robinson was also a producer and broadcaster for the Canadian Broadcasting Corporation, and worked for Native Communications Incorporated.  In 1985, he co-authored a work entitled Infested Blanket, an historical indictment of the Canadian government's past dealings with Aboriginal peoples.

Robinson entered provincial politics on September 21, 1993, winning a by-election in the northern riding of Rupertsland (he replaced Elijah Harper in the assembly).  Running for the NDP, Robinson received 1697 votes; his closest opponent, Liberal George Munroe, received 1023.

Robinson was easily re-elected in the provincial election of 1995, and served as the NDP's critic for Aboriginal and Northern Affairs.  Also in 1995, he supported Lorne Nystrom for leader of the federal New Democratic Party.

After the NDP won a majority government in the 1999 election, Premier Gary Doer named Robinson Minister of Aboriginal and Northern Affairs with responsibility for the Communities Economic Development Fund on October 5, 1999. Following a cabinet shuffle on September 25, 2002, he became Minister of Culture, Heritage and Tourism with responsibility for Sport.

In 2003, Robinson supported Bill Blaikie's campaign to become leader of the federal NDP.  In the 2003 provincial election, Robinson was re-elected with over 86% of the vote in his riding.  He was returned again in the 2007 election. In 2007, he was reassigned as Minister of Culture, Heritage, Tourism and Sport.

Election history

2016 Manitoba general election

2011 Manitoba general election

2007 Manitoba general election

2003 Manitoba general election

1999 Manitoba general election

References

External links
 Biography from the Manitoba NDP Caucus

1953 births
Living people
New Democratic Party of Manitoba MLAs
First Nations politicians
Deputy premiers of Manitoba
Indspire Awards
21st-century Canadian politicians